Jan Hirt (born 21 January 1991) is a Czech professional racing cyclist, who currently rides for UCI WorldTeam .

Career
Hirt joined  in 2012 as a stagiaire, later becoming a member of the team in 2013 before moving to  the following year. During the 2014 season, he came third in the general classification (GC) of the Tour Alsace, four seconds behind Jack Haig and ten seconds behind winner Karel Hnik. In 2015, Hirt moved to  where he competed in the Tour of Austria, Tour de Suisse, Tour of Turkey, Volta a Catalunya, Tour de Pologne, and the Il Lombardia in the same year. He achieved success in Austria, coming second on the fourth stage to move to the top of the GC before moving down to third where he later finished. However, Hirt did not finish the Il Lombardia.

In 2016, Hirt again competed in the Tour of Austria where he won the fourth stage to move into the lead of the GC. He started the next stage with a 1:17 lead over second-placed Guillaume Martin, a gap which he held to the end of the competition three days later. He also competed in the Abu Dhabi Tour, Tour de Suisse, Tour of Turkey, Volta a Catalunya, and the Il Lombardia, where he again did not finish. In 2017, Hirt competed in his first Grand Tour, the Giro d'Italia where he placed 12th in the GC. Cyclingnews.com described Hirt as a "key GC addition" to the team.

In 2018, Hirt competed in two Grand Tours, the Vuelta a España and the Giro, where he finished 74th and 46th, respectively. He also competed in the Il Lombardia, Volta a Catalunya, Tour of Oman, and the Tour of the Alps, where he finished 10th in the GC.

Major results

2008
 1st Stage 4 Tour du Pays de Vaud
2009
 1st  Road race, National Junior Road Championships
 1st  Overall Grand Prix Général Patton
1st Stage 2
2012
 5th Overall Okolo Slovenska
1st  Young rider classification
 9th Overall Czech Cycling Tour
2013
 1st Stage 1 (TTT) Czech Cycling Tour
 2nd Overall Peace Race U23
 4th Overall Tour Alsace
 7th Overall Settimana Ciclistica Lombarda
 8th Overall Tour d'Azerbaïdjan
1st Stage 4
2014
 3rd Overall Tour Alsace
 3rd Grand Prix Královéhradeckého kraje
 6th Overall Szlakiem Grodów Piastowskich
 8th Overall Czech Cycling Tour
1st  Czech rider classification
1st Stage 3
2015
 3rd Overall Tour of Austria
 8th Visegrad 4 Bicycle Race – GP Czech Republic
 8th Visegrad 4 Bicycle Race – GP Polski
 10th Overall Szlakiem Grodów Piastowskich
2016
 1st  Overall Tour of Austria
1st Stage 4
2017
 3rd Overall Tour of Croatia
 5th Overall Czech Cycling Tour
 6th Pro Ötztaler 5500
2018
 10th Overall Tour of the Alps
2019
 5th Overall Tour de Suisse
 7th Overall Tour of the Alps
2021
 7th Overall Czech Cycling Tour
1st  Czech rider classification
2022
 1st  Overall Tour of Oman
1st Stage 5
 5th Road race, National Road Championships
 6th Overall Giro d'Italia
1st Stage 16

Grand Tour general classification results timeline

References

External links

 

1991 births
Living people
Czech male cyclists
Czech Giro d'Italia stage winners
Sportspeople from Třebíč